Cleon H. Turner (born December 29, 1945 in Brockton, Massachusetts) is a former state representative in Massachusetts. He represented the First Barnstable District of Brewster from 2005 to 2015. Turner graduated from Silver Lake Regional High School, earned his B.A. from the University of Southern Maine, an A.S. from the University of Maine and his J.D. from Suffolk University Law School. He was elected in 2004 and began his term in 2005. In December 2013, he announced his retirement effective January 6, 2015.

References

1945 births
Living people
University of Maine alumni
University of Southern Maine alumni
Suffolk University Law School alumni
Democratic Party members of the Massachusetts House of Representatives
Massachusetts lawyers
People from Dennis, Massachusetts
Politicians from Brockton, Massachusetts